John Isner was the two-time defending champion, but was defeated by 2012 finalist Lleyton Hewitt in the semifinals.
Nicolas Mahut defeated Hewitt in the final 5–7, 7–5, 6–3.

Seeds

Draw

Finals

Top half

Bottom half

Qualifying

Seeds
All seeds received a bye into the second round.

Qualifiers

Qualifying draw

First qualifier

Second qualifier

Third qualifier

Fourth qualifier

References

 Main Draw
 Qualifying Draw

Hall of Fame Tennis Championships - Singles